Coya  is one of 24 parishes (administrative divisions) in Piloña, a municipality within the province and autonomous community of Asturias, in northern Spain.

The population is 376 (INE 2011).

Villages and hamlets
 Bargaedo 
 Monte 
 Mures 
 Serpiedo (Sarpiéu) 
 Villabajo 
 Villarriba 
 La Baraya 
 Brañaviella (Brañavieya) 
 Buenavista 
 La Cabaña 
 El Canello (El Caneyu) 
 La Carabaña 
 La Cotariella 
 La Gallera 
 Tranvarria (Trambarría)

References

Parishes in Piloña